Las medias de seda ("The Silk Stockings") is a 1956 Mexican film. It stars Carlos Orellana.

External links
 

1956 films
Mexican musical comedy films
1950s Spanish-language films
1950s Mexican films
1956 musical comedy films
Mexican black-and-white films